Birgit Thumm (born July 3, 1980, in Heidenheim, Baden-Württemberg) is a volleyball player from Germany.

She made her debut for the German Women's National Team in 1999. She played at the 2002 FIVB Volleyball Women's World Championship in Germany; she represented her native country at the 2004 Summer Olympics in Athens, Greece.

She is 184 cm tall, and is nicknamed "Thummi"

Honours
 1999 European Championship – 4th place
 2001 European Championship – 9th place
 2001 FIVB World Grand Prix – 8th place 
 2002 FIVB World Grand Prix – 3rd place 
 2002 World Championship – 10th place
 2004 Olympic Games – 9th place 
 2005 FIVB World Grand Prix – 10th place 
 2006 World Championship – 11th place

References

External links 
  DVV profile

1980 births
Living people
German women's volleyball players
Volleyball players at the 2004 Summer Olympics
Olympic volleyball players of Germany